The 2014–15 CEV Challenge Cup was the 35th edition of the CEV Challenge Cup tournament, the former CEV Cup.

Serbian club Vojvodina NS Seme Novi Sad beat Portuguese S.L. Benfica in the finale and achieved first CEV Challenge Cup trophy. Brazilian player Flávio Soares from runner-up club was the Most Valuable Player of the final tournament.

Participating teams

Qualification phase

2nd round
1st leg 4–6 November 2014
2nd leg 18–20 November 2014

|}

Notes

Main phase

16th finals
1st leg 2–4 December 2014
2nd leg 16–18 December 2014

|}

Notes

8th finals
1st leg 13–15 January 2015
2nd leg 20–21 January 2015

|}

4th finals
1st leg 3–5 March 2015
2nd leg 10–12 March 2015

|}

Final phase

Semi-finals

|}

First leg

|}

Second leg

|}

Final

First leg

|}

Second leg

|}

Final standing

References

External links
 Official site

CEV Challenge Cup
2014 in volleyball
2015 in volleyball